155th meridian may refer to:

155th  meridian east, a line of longitude east of the Greenwich Meridian
155th meridian west, a line of longitude west of the Greenwich Meridian